William Deedes (17 October 1796 – 30 November 1862) was an English cricketer who played first-class cricket from 1817 to 1826, and a Conservative Party politician.

Cricket 
Deedes made his debut first-class appearance in 1817 for the Old Wykehamists. Playing no further first-class cricket until 1821, he played for various Marylebone Cricket Club sides over the next four years.

Deedes made his county cricket debut playing for Hampshire against Sussex and was dismissed by Jem Broadbridge in each innings.

Now 29 years of age, he was to play just two further first-class matches within the following calendar year, his final first-class appearance coming as a tailender in a combined Hampshire and Surrey team against Sussex in 1826. He took seven stumpings and two catches in the match. Deedes' brother, John and son William also played first-class cricket.

Politics 
Deedes was elected to House of Commons as a Member of Parliament (MP) for East Kent at an unopposed by-election March 1845.  He was re-elected unopposed in 1847 in a contested election in 1852 general election, but was defeated at the general election in April 1857. However, Sir Edward Dering, a Liberal who won one of East Kent's two seats in 1852, resigned from the House of Commons on 1 December 1857, and Deedes was elected unopposed at the resulting by-election.  He was returned unopposed in 1859, and held the seat until his death in 1862 aged 66.

References

External links 
 

1796 births
1862 deaths
English cricketers
English cricketers of 1787 to 1825
Marylebone Cricket Club cricketers
Kent cricketers
Hampshire cricketers
Gentlemen cricketers
Conservative Party (UK) MPs for English constituencies
UK MPs 1841–1847
UK MPs 1847–1852
UK MPs 1852–1857
UK MPs 1857–1859
UK MPs 1859–1865
Old Wykehamists cricketers
Non-international England cricketers
Marylebone Cricket Club Second 10 with 1 Other cricketers
Church Estates Commissioners